The yellow-crested tanager (Loriotus rufiventer) is a species of bird in the family Thraupidae.
It is found in the western Amazon Basin (Peru, Acre and northwestern Bolivia).
Its natural habitat is subtropical or tropical moist lowland forests.

References

yellow-crested tanager
Birds of the Amazon Basin
Birds of the Peruvian Amazon
yellow-crested tanager
Taxonomy articles created by Polbot
Taxobox binomials not recognized by IUCN